Jackson High School is a public high school located in Jackson Township, Ohio, United States, near Massillon. Part of the Jackson Local School District, it serves grades 9 through 12.  The school's colors are purple and gold and the athletic teams are known as the Polar Bears.

Academics
Jackson High School is ranked the 64th best public high school within Ohio, and 983rd nationally as of 2022. Students have the opportunity to take Advanced Placement® course work and exams. The AP® participation rate at Jackson High School is 52 percent, and the exam participation rate is 78%. At the state level, 88% of students receive advanced or accelerated on their state proficiency tests.

Athletics
Jackson High School is a founding member school of the Federal League, a high school athletic conference in Ohio.

State Championships
Boys Basketball: 2010, 2017

Boys Baseball: 2014, 2017

Music department
The Jackson Marching Band produces a show yearly (along with one black light half time show). The band has marched in the Tournament of Roses Parade (1982 and 1998), Macy's Thanksgiving Day Parade (1999), Cotton Bowl Parade,  Orange Bowl Parade (1992), Fiesta Bowl Parade and pre-game (1994), and Walt Disney World Christmas Day Parade (1987, 1991, 1995 and 1998). The band has also traveled to Hawaii, Universal Studios in Orlando, Florida, and Phoenix, Arizona. In 2009 the Marching Band traveled to New Orleans to play in the Sugar Bowl half time show. In 2012, the band traveled to Orlando to play in the Disney Thanksgiving Day Parade. In March 2014 the band successfully traveled to China. While in China the band performed on the Great Wall of China, along with sightseeing, the band visited their sister school in Jiaozhou, Qingdao. The band performed in a grand concert tour with their sister school. The band department has four bands, a Freshman band, two concert bands, and Symphony band. All four bands participate in competitions sponsored by the Ohio Music Educators Association. In 2018, the band took a trip to Ireland and marched in the St. Patrick's Day Parade in Ireland. In 2021, the band participated in the first Ohio State University skull session in nearly two years on September 11, and traveled to Disney World and marched in the Magic Kingdom Parade over the district’s spring break in 2022.

The choral department has six choirs, which compete in competitions sponsored by the Ohio Music Educators Association. Jackson's show choir, the Jacks-N-Jills, performs throughout the region. The Choral Department puts on the school's annual musical production and the choir takes a semi-annual trip to Pennsylvania and New York City.

Art department
Jackson High School has the largest high school arts program in Stark County, called JSA (Jackson School for the Arts). Students are accepted into the arts school as freshmen and sometimes sophomores and follow the program until senior year. In the school of the arts students must meet GPA requirements, audition for dance classes and participate in technical and performing areas. Students in JSA begin their day an hour before other students to fit in more classes and thus have more time to be in more arts courses as well as the required core classes. In their senior year, students are also required to complete an internship in a field relating to their area of concentration.

Other distinctions
In 2006, Jackson High School was rated "academically excellent" by the Ohio State Board of Education, scoring 110 and meeting 12 of 12 academic achievement indicators. The Jackson Local School district scored 106.9, making it the highest scoring public school district in Stark and several surrounding counties. In 2005 and 2006, Jackson High School was named to Newsweek's list of the top 1,000 schools in America.  In 2010, Jackson High School received recognition as a "National Blue Ribbon School". In 2015, Jackson High School was ranked as the 33rd best public high school in the state of Ohio. US News also ranked Jackson High School as the 870th best public high school in the nation for 2015.

Jackson also boasts a speech and debate program, where students can be a part of the National Forensics League. The team won state championships in the Ohio High School Speech League's 2010, 2012, and 2017 tournaments.

Notable alumni
Carlin Isles - Professional rugby union player on the United States national rugby sevens team 
Mark Kozelek - Professional singer, guitarist, and record producer
 Dillon Dingler - Professional MLB player for the Detroit Tigers, currently in the MiLB
Kyle Nicolas Professional MLB player for the Pittsburgh Pirates, currently in the MiLB
Kyle Young Former D1 college basketball player for Ohio State University

References

External links
 District Website

High schools in Stark County, Ohio
Public high schools in Ohio